Carl Justus Hagman (14 February 1859 – 28 February 1936) was a Swedish actor. Hagman made his stage debut in 1876 and made his first appearance in a film in 1913 in the Victor Sjöström film Miraklet. He performed in another thirty films until 1935. Between 1882 and 1885 Hagman was an employee of the Svenska teatern in Helsingfors, he also worked at the Storåteatern, Vasateatern and the Albert Ranft Teatern and Södra Teatern.

Amongst his roles are Trettondagsafton, Don Cesar de Bazano, Fagin in Oliver Twist, gamle Kampe in Det nya systemet, Didrik in Ljungby horn and the character Lutz in Gamla Heidelberg.

Justus Hagman is buried at the Norra begravningsplatsen cemetery in Stockholm. He was buried on 23 May 1946.

Selected filmography
Laughter and Tears (Löjen och tårar) (1913)
The Clergyman (Prästen) (1914)
Synnöve Solbakken (1919)
 The Eyes of Love (1922)
 The Counts at Svansta (1924)
Ingmar's Inheritance (1925)
 The Lady of the Camellias (1925)
 She Is the Only One (1926)
 Sin (1928)
 Gustaf Wasa (1928)
 Say It with Music (1929)

References

External links

1859 births
1936 deaths
Swedish male stage actors
Swedish male film actors
Swedish male silent film actors
20th-century Swedish male actors
People from Solna Municipality
Male actors from Stockholm
Burials at Norra begravningsplatsen